Thein is a name found in several cultures. Notable people with this name include:

Burmese name 
Aung Min Thein (1961–2007), film director and artist
Thein Han (basketball) (born 1998), basketball player
Hla Thein (born 1944), athlete
Hmawbi Saya Thein (1862–1942), writer, known for his articles on Burmese culture and history.
Khin Maung Thein (born 1940), politician and political prisoner who currently serves as a Pyithu Hluttaw MP for Sagaing Township
Kyaw Thein (born 1954), politician who currently serves as an Amyotha Hluttaw MP for Rakhine State No. 7 Constituency
Nilar Thein (born 1972), democracy activist and political prisoner
Phyo Min Thein (born 1969), politician and former inmate who is currently serving as Chief Minister of Yangon Region and Yangon Region Parliament MP for Hlegu Township Constituency No. 2
Soe Thein (born 1949), incumbent Minister of the President's Office of Myanmar (Burma) and a former Minister for Industry-2
Thein Aung, politician, Chief Minister of Ayeyarwady Region, Myanmar from 2011 to 2016
Thein Han (1910–1986), painter
Thein Htaik (born 1952), politician, Union Auditor General of Myanmar, appointed to the post on 7 September 2012
Thein Htay (born 1955), politician, former Minister for Border Affairs and Minister for Industrial Development of Myanmar (Burma)
Thein Kyu (born 1944), dental professor
Thein Lwin (born 1957), politician who currently serves as a House of Nationalities member of parliament for Kachin State № 10 Constituency
Thein Myint (born 1937), boxer
Thein Nyunt (born 1948), politician, currently one of six ministers of the President's Office, in the Cabinet of Burma (Myanmar), as well as the Mayor and the Chairman of the Naypyidaw Council
Thein Oo (born 1948),  a pioneer of Myanmar's computer industry
Thein Pe Myint (1914–1978), politician, writer and journalist
Thein Than Win (born 1991), footballer
Thein Tun (born 1940), retired Major-general and politician, serving as the Minister for Posts and Telecommunications of Myanmar
Thein Tun (businessman) (born 1937), businessman and founder of Myanmar Golden Star
Thein Tun Oo (born 1966), politician who served as member of parliament in the Pyithu Hluttaw for Amarapura Township from 2011 to 2016
Thein Tut (born 1955), professor of dental medicine
Win Thein, engineer, is the chief minister of Bago Region, appointed by president Htin Kyaw in 2016
Yaza Win Thein (born 1986), footballer

German-language name 
Alexandra Thein (born 1963), German politician
Joe Thein (born 1991), Luxembourgish politician
Mechthildis Thein (1888–1959), German stage and film actress of the silent period
Ulrich Thein (1930–1995), German actor, film director and screenwriter

Burmese-language surnames
German-language surnames

Tamil-language name 
Thein Manimekalai Sowrirajan (born 1992), Academic, Architect and Entrepreneur